Roy Henry (30 May 1907 – 25 November 1987) was an Australian rules footballer who played with Fitzroy in the Victorian Football League (VFL).

Notes

External links 
		

1907 births
1987 deaths
Australian rules footballers from Victoria (Australia)
Fitzroy Football Club players